Cars Mater-National Championship is a 2007 racing game published by THQ for the PlayStation 2, PlayStation 3, Xbox 360, Microsoft Windows, Nintendo DS, Game Boy Advance, and Wii.

The game received mixed reviews from critics. A sequel, Cars Race-O-Rama, was released in 2009.

Premise and gameplay
Taking place sometime after the events of the previous game, Cars Mater-National Championship is about the first ever Mater-National tournament, held in Radiator Springs by Lightning McQueen and Mater. The player controls McQueen as he races against opponents from around the world, all while overseeing the building of his racing headquarters and the ambitious Radiator Springs racing stadium. In addition to returning characters, there are multiple new characters that appear in the game, many of which come from different countries such as Germany and Japan.

Just like the previous game, Mater-National features three hub-worlds; Radiator Springs, Ornament Valley, and Tailfin Pass - all of which have been redesigned, although certain areas are blocked off and can only be accessed in races.

Playable Characters
There are 17 playable characters, with 5 of them being unlockable and 2 of them are guest characters from Monsters, Inc.

 Doc Hudson
 Fillmore
 Flo
 Emma
 Giovanni
 Gudmund
 Koji
 Lightning McQueen
 Luigi	
 Mater	
 Mike
 Monster Lighting McQueen
 Monster Mater
 Otto
 Ramone
 Sarge
 Sulley

Notes

Reception

Cars Mater-National has received average reviews from critics upon the release. PSXExtreme gave this game a 7.0, praising the better audio, but criticized the graphics. IGN rated the Nintendo DS version of the game 6.8/10, calling it "cute" and "kid-friendly" but never made into 5th gear. Metacritic aggregate scores for the Nintendo DS version 69/100, the Xbox 360 version 58/100, the PlayStation 3 version 63/100, and the PlayStation 2 version 67/100.

References

External links
 

2007 video games
Cars (franchise) video games
Disney video games
Game Boy Advance games
Nintendo DS games
Open-world video games
PlayStation 2 games
PlayStation 3 games
Racing video games
THQ games
Video games based on films
Video games developed in Australia
Video games set in Arizona
Wii games
Wii Wheel games
Windows games
Xbox 360 games
Tantalus Media games
Multiplayer and single-player video games
Video games developed in the United States
Rainbow Studios games